Aeromás is a cargo and private jet charter airline based in Montevideo in Uruguay (Carrasco International Airport). It is a leading company in the commercial air transport market with recognized prestige in Uruguay and Mercosur, with commercial aviation activity since 1983, providing Air Transport Services for Passengers and Cargo since 1988, as well as Medevac flights.

Based at Carrasco International Airport in Montevideo, it is the longest running company in commercial air transport in Uruguay, and the first certified as 135 Operator (135-001) in the country, being also the first one certified for a business jet operation under Uruguayan flag.

Its founder and CEO, Daniel Dalmás, a pilot with fifty years in aviation, who has more than 13.000 hours of experience as Airline Captain on intercontinental operations. He currently chairs the National Association of Commercial Air Transport Companies (A.N.E.P.A.) as well as, since its formation, the Chamber of Aeronautical Operators of Uruguay (C.O.P.A.U.).

Aeromás has a long experience in the transfer of executives, politicians, artists and top-level athletes, as well as in the transfer of critical patients and transplant organs.

It has also operated, for more than 20 years, as a Flight School and currently as an authorized Civil Aviation Instruction Center (C.I.A.C.) with its Aeromás Training Center.

History
The company was founded by actual Director Daniel Dalmas in 1983 as a banner towing business. It evolved into public transport in 1988 becoming Uruguay's largest air taxi company. It is partly owned by Southern Cross Aviation Inc., Fort Lauderdale, Florida

Fleet
The Aeromás fleet includes the following aircraft (as of February 2023):

1 Embraer EMB 110P1 Bandeirante CX-MAS
1 Learjet 60 CX-SCA
1 Piper PA-38 Tomahawk CX-BKC

Accidents & incidents
 On the 16th of February 2023, in the early morning, an Aeromás Cessna 208 registered CX-MAX was destroyed in a forced landing incident at Berisso, Argentina. There were no casualties.

External links
Aeromas
Southern Cross Aviation Inc.

References

Airlines of Uruguay
Airlines established in 1983
1983 establishments in Uruguay
Companies based in Montevideo